The Paracatu mine is one of the largest gold surface mines in Brazil, and also in the world. 

The mine is located in Minas Gerais state, in the southcentral region of Brazil. It is owned and operated by the Canadian Kinross Gold mining company. 

The mine has estimated reserves of 17.5 million oz of gold.

References 

Gold mines in Brazil
Minas Gerais
Surface mines in Brazil
Kinross Gold